Applico, LLC is a business consultancy headquartered in New York City, with offices in San Francisco. It provides services for traditional enterprises adapting to a platform business model. Applico works alongside C-suites and Boards as operating partners to help traditional companies build or buy their own platform business. Applico's team is composed of entrepreneurs, operators and bankers. Alex Moazed, CEO, and Nick Johnson, Head of Platforms, co-authored the book Modern Monopolies, which describes the platform business model and why it dominates the 21st century economy.

History
Applico was founded by current CEO Alex Moazed in 2009 while attending Babson College. It started as a BlackBerry app development firm to build relationships with developers who were otherwise focused on the highly competitive iOS and Android markets, allowing Applico to establish itself in software development.

Awards
 101 Best and Brightest Companies To Work For
 Empact100, 2012
 2011 Annual Communicator Winner – The Communicator Awards

Press
Applico was profiled in the Wall Street Journal in an article called "Inside the App Culture". The article related Applico to the fast-growing mobile startup based in NYC seen in the HBO show Girls and describes Applico's strategy of focusing on mobile technology: "If there's an art, it's not so much in making a pretty app as it is spotting the next wave before the competition does."

Applico licensed its data product, Platform Insights, to WisdomTree in 2019. WisdomTree launched PLAT, an ETF composed of platform businesses, and announced that Applico’s data was involved in the creation of the ETF

References

External links
 Official website

Android (operating system) software
Technology companies of the United States
Companies based in New York City